Barahat Junction railway station is a junction railway station on the Dumka–Bhagalpur line of Sahibganj loop under Malda railway division of the Eastern Railway zone. The station is situated beside State Highway 23 at Barahat in Banka district in the Indian state of Bihar.

History
The metre-gauge railway track from Bhagalpur Junction railway station to Mandar Hill railway station branch was opened in 1907. The branch was converted to broad gauge. A new railway line from Mandar Hill to Hansdiha became operational on 23 December 2012 and Dumka to Barapalasi route was reconstructed in June 2014 and finally the full track became operational in 2015.

References

Malda railway division
Railway stations in Banka district